Kettering is an unincorporated area and census-designated place in Prince George's County, Maryland, United States. At the 2020 United States Census, the population was 14,424,. Kettering is adjacent to Prince George's Community College, the upscale gated community of Woodmore, Six Flags America, Evangel Temple megachurch, and the community of Largo at the end of the Washington Metro Blue Line. Watkins Regional Park in Kettering offers a large playground, a colorful carousel, miniature golf, a miniature train ride, and various animals.

Etymology
The name Kettering was created by a suburban housing developer in the 1960s when development began.

Geography

Demographics

2020 census

Note: the US Census treats Hispanic/Latino as an ethnic category. This table excludes Latinos from the racial categories and assigns them to a separate category. Hispanics/Latinos can be of any race.

2000 Census
As of the census of 2000, there were 11,008 people, 3,814 households, and 2,955 families residing in the CDP. The racial makeup of the CDP was 5.78% White, 90.62% African American, 0.19% Native American, 1.24% Asian, 0.47% from other races, and 1.71% from two or more races. Hispanic or Latino of any race were 0.95% of the population.

There were 3,814 households, out of which 36.3% had children under the age of 18 living with them, 50.0% were married couples living together, 23.3% had a female householder with no husband present, and 22.5% were non-families. 18.4% of all households were made up of individuals, and 1.7% had someone living alone who was 65 years of age or older. The average household size was 2.86 and the average family size was 3.24.

In the CDP, the population was spread out, with 26.6% under the age of 18, 7.1% from 18 to 24, 30.6% from 25 to 44, 29.1% from 45 to 64, and 6.6% who were 65 years of age or older. The median age was 37 years. For every 100 females, there were 81.3 males. For every 100 females age 18 and over, there were 75.8 males.

The median income for a household in the CDP was $78,735, and the median income for a family was $82,777. Males had a median income of $47,059 versus $45,243 for females. The per capita income for the CDP was $30,398. About 0.8% of families and 1.9% of the population were below the poverty line, including 1.9% of those under age 18 and 2.0% of those age 65 or over. By the end of 2020, the CDP ranks # 6 among top 10 richest black communities in US, with an average family income of $107,008.

Kettering was majority white for much of its history. While majority white in the 1970 census, Kettering was 49% white by 1980 and only 17% white by 1990. The white population quickly declined as the community became majority African-American.

Government and infrastructure
Prince George's County Police Department District 2 Station in Brock Hall CDP, with a Bowie postal address, serves the community.

The U.S. Postal Service operates the Kettering Post Office in Kettering CDP.

Education
Kettering is a part of the Prince George's County Public Schools.

Kettering, Perrywood, and Lake Arbor elementary schools serve sections of the Kettering CDP. Almost all of the CDP is zoned to Kettering Middle School, with a portion zoned to Ernest Everett Just Middle School. Most of the CDP is zoned to Largo High School while a portion is zoned to Dr. Henry A. Wise Jr. High School.

Kettering is served by the Largo-Kettering Branch of the Prince George's County Memorial Library System in Largo.

References

African-American upper class
Census-designated places in Prince George's County, Maryland
Census-designated places in Maryland
Washington metropolitan area